Clare Shine (born 18 May 1995) is a former Irish international footballer who most recently played for SWPL club Glasgow City. She previously played for Women's National League (WNL) club Cork City. She made her debut for the Republic of Ireland women's national football team in November 2015. Shine attended Regina Mundi College in Douglas, Cork and played in an All-Ireland Senior Camogie Championship Final for Cork.

Club career
After beginning her career with Douglas Hall AFC, Shine joined Cork City Women's when the Women's National League (WNL) was formed in 2011. In 2013, she transferred to Raheny United and collected a league and FAI Women's Cup double with "The Pandas". She also represented the club in the UEFA Women's Champions League.

Shine's career was interrupted by a broken leg and a period out of the game when she tried to come back too quickly from the injury. In May 2015 she moved to Scotland to join Glasgow City after a successful two-week trial. In November 2015 Shine scored a hat-trick in City's 3–0 Scottish Women's Cup final win over Hibernian.

In March 2017, Shine brought her spell with Glasgow City to an end and returned home to Cork City, partly because she wanted to start playing Gaelic games again. She scored the only goal of the 2017 FAI Women's Cup final, as Cork beat UCD Waves 1–0 at the Aviva Stadium in November 2017.

In 2019, Shine re-joined Glasgow City and scored on her second debut in a 5–1 win over Stirling University. She left the club on 24th September, 2022, announcing her retirement from football.

International career
Shine was 15 when she was part of the under-17 squad who lost the final of the 2010 UEFA Women's Under-17 Championship in Switzerland. She then participated in Ireland's 2010 FIFA U-17 Women's World Cup campaign. At the 2014 UEFA Women's Under-19 Championship, Shine scored the only goal against Spain as Ireland won their group, before crashing 4–0 to the Netherlands in the semi-final. She had recovered from a broken leg sustained 10 weeks earlier.

National coach Susan Ronan gave Shine a senior debut in a 3–0 UEFA Women's Euro 2017 qualifying defeat by Spain on 26 November 2015 at Tallaght Stadium, Dublin.

Notes

References

External links

Clare Shine at Football Association of Ireland (FAI)

1995 births
Living people
Republic of Ireland women's association footballers
Republic of Ireland women's international footballers
Glasgow City F.C. players
Association footballers from Cork (city)
Republic of Ireland expatriate association footballers
Raheny United F.C. players
Women's National League (Ireland) players
Expatriate women's footballers in Scotland
Irish expatriate sportspeople in Scotland
Cork City W.F.C. players
Scottish Women's Premier League players
Women's association football forwards
Cork camogie players
Republic of Ireland women's youth international footballers